Daniel Jacob Danielsen (also known as Dollin, born 25 June 1871 in Copenhagen, grew up in Tórshavn, Faroe Islands, died 16 October 1916) was a Faroese missionary and humanitarian worker.

Family and early years 
Danielsen's mother Sigrid was a paternal aunt of Victor Danielsen, who was the first Faroese Bible translator and Plymouth Brethren missionary. Sigrid went to Copenhagen as a young girl. In 1871 she gave birth to a boy; she was not married at the time. The boy was named Ludvig Daniel Jacob. The name Ludvig was after his father, whom he never knew, and he did not use the name. Dollin is a common abbreviation for Daniel Jacob in the Faroe Islands. Fairly soon after the birth of D.J. Danielsen, mother and son moved back to the Faroes, where she got married in 1874.

At the age of 18 Danielsen went to Scotland to be trained as an engineer. He worked as an engineer around the world; among other countries he came to South Africa and to America. Even though he came from a Christian family, it was not until 1897 that he became religious; it happened at an open-air service in Glasgow, after which he was radically converted.

Missionary and humanitarian work 
In 1901-03 Danielsen was in Congo Free State as a missionary for Congo-Balolo Mission with base in Bonginda. He was primarily an engineer on the missionary boat that sailed up and down the Congo River to and from the missionary station.

In 1903 Danielsen was sent home from the mission as accusations were made against him that he had been violent against some of the locals (later it turned out that the accusations had been false). On his way back to the shore he met Roger Casement, who at that time was British consul in Congo. Casement had been anointed to write a report on the atrocities that were being made against the natives by Belgian soldiers. Congo was at that time a personal property of King Leopold II of Belgium and he exploited the local population fiercely to profit from increased rubber demand. Methods of coercion included whipping, hostage-taking, rape and murder, and burning of gardens and villages. (The most famous atrocity, the severing of a hand or foot, was undertaken by native soldiers to prove to their white officers that they had not wasted ammunition, and was not a punishment for rubber shortfalls.) Casement was in a desperate need for an engineer to steer his boat up the Congo River as his initial engineer couldn't continue. Danielsen joined Casement and they travelled together for a couple of months. What Danielsen did next to being an engineer was being a photographer and he took several atrocity photographs of people who had been mutilated and later he showed them in meetings back in England and in the Faroe Islands.

In 1904 Danielsen moved to the Faroe Islands with his wife, Lina, where he became one of the most prolific evangelists for the Brethren movement in the Faroes.

References

Faroese Protestant missionaries
Protestant missionaries in the Democratic Republic of the Congo
1871 births
1916 deaths
Faroese Plymouth Brethren
Danish humanitarians
19th-century Faroese people
20th-century Faroese people
Congo Free State people